This is a list of schools in the Roman Catholic Archdiocese of Hartford.

High schools
 High schools
 Academy of Our Lady of Mercy, Lauralton Hall, Milford
 Canterbury School, New Milford
 East Catholic High School, Manchester
 Holy Cross High School, Waterbury
 Northwest Catholic High School, West Hartford
 Notre Dame High School, West Haven
 Sacred Heart Academy, Hamden
 Sacred Heart High School, Waterbury
 St. Paul Catholic High School, Bristol

Elementary schools
The following is a list of the currently functioning elementary and middle schools run by the Archdiocese of Hartford.   All information was gathered from the records of the Archdiocese's Office of Catholic Schools.

Valerie Mara, Superintendent of Catholic Schools

Former schools
St. Gabriel's School in Milford opened in 1965; at the time clergy were the primary teachers. By the 2010s there were fewer clergy teachers, and lay teachers were more expensive; in addition fewer parishioners gave money to the church. By 2016 the school's budget was $111,709 in deficit. In 2008-2009 it had a peak enrollment of 219. In 2014 there was concern expressed about the school's survival expressed in the community, and in 2016 enrollment was down to 139, with 22 being in special education. The school directors chose to close the school in June 2016; the archdiocese did not order the closure.

St. Anthony School in Bristol closed in 2016.

St. Vincent de Paul School in East Haven closed in 2016. That year enrollment was 89.

St. Anthony School was in Winsted, Winchester. It opened in 1865. Circa 2008 it had about 200 students. By 2020 this figure declined to 90. It closed in 2020. At the time it was the oldest school continually operated by the archdiocese.

Sts. Cyril and Methodius School in Hartford closed in 2014. St. Augustine School in Hartford closed in 2016 and merged into a partnership school St. Brigid-St. Augustine. However, that partnership school closed in 2020.

References

Hartford, Roman Catholic Archdiocese of
Education in Hartford, Connecticut
Schools
Hartford